The 2011 Sultan Qaboos Cup was the 39th edition of the Sultan Qaboos Cup, the premier knockout tournament for football teams in Oman.

The competition began on 16 September 2011 with the qualification round and concluded on 26 December 2011. Al-Oruba SC were the defending champions, having won their third title in 2010. On Monday 26 December 2011, Dhofar S.C.S.C. were crowned the champions of the 2011 Sultan Qaboos Cup when they defeated Al-Ittihad Club 1–0, hence winning the title for the record eighth time.

Teams
This year the tournament had 36 teams. The winners qualified for the 2013 AFC Cup.
 Ahli Sidab Club (Sidab)
 Al-Bashaer Club
 Al-Hamra SC (Al-Hamra)
 Al-Ittihad Club (Salalah)
 Al-Khaboora SC (Al-Khaboora)
 Al-Musannah SC (Al-Musannah)
 Al-Mudhaibi SC (Mudhaibi)
 Al-Nahda Club (Al-Buraimi)
 Al-Nasr S.C.S.C. (Salalah)
 Al-Oruba SC (Sur)
 Al-Rustaq SC (Rustaq)
 Al-Salam SC (Sohar)
 Al-Seeb Club (Seeb)
 Al-Shabab Club (Seeb)
 Al-Suwaiq Club (Suwaiq
 Al-Tali'aa SC (Sur)
 Al-Wahda SC (Sur)
 Bahla Club (Bahla)
 Bidia SC (Bidiya)
 Bowsher Club (Bawshar)
 Dhofar S.C.S.C. (Salalah)
 Fanja SC (Fanja)
 Ibri Club (Ibri)
 Ja'lan SC (Jalan Bani Bu Ali)
 Madha SC  (Madha)
 Majees SC (Majees)
 Mirbat SC (Mirbat)
 Muscat Club (Muscat)
 Nizwa Club (Nizwa)
 Oman Club (Muscat)
 Saham SC (Saham)
 Salalah SC (Salalah)
 Sohar SC (Sohar)
 Sur SC (Sur)
 Yanqul SC (Yanqul)

Qualification round
8 teams played a knockout tie. 4 ties were played over one leg. The first match was played between Al-Hamra SC and Madha SC on 16 September 2011. Al-Hamra SC, Al-Rustaq SC, Nizwa Club, Bahla Club advanced to the Round of 32 after winning their respective ties.

Round of 32
32 teams played a knockout tie. 16 ties were played over one leg. The first match played was between Al-Mudhaibi SC and Majees SC on 29 September 2011. 16 teams advanced to the Round of 16.

Round of 16
16 teams played a knockout tie. 8 ties were played over one leg. The first match was played between Ahli Sidab Club and Al-Mudhaibi SC on 22 October 2011. 8 teams advanced to the Quarterfinals.

Quarterfinals
8 teams played a knockout tie. 4 ties were played over two legs. The first match was played between Sur SC and Al-Oruba SC on 1 November 2011. Sur SC, Al-Ittihad Club, Salalah SC and Dhofar S.C.S.C. qualified for the Semifinals.

1st Legs

2nd Legs

Semifinals
4 teams played a knockout tie. 2 ties were played over two legs. The first match was played between Sur SC and Al-Ittihad Club on 1 December 2011. Dhofar S.C.S.C. and Al-Ittihad Club qualified for the finals.

1st Legs

2nd Legs

Finals

References

External links
Oman Sultan Cup 2011–2012 at Soccerway.com
Oman Sultan Cup 2011–2012 at Goalzz.com

Sultan Qaboos Cup seasons
Cup